Bidens triplinervia is a Latin American species of flowering plants in the sunflower family. It is native to Mesoamerica and South America, from Chihuahua State in northern Mexico to Jujuy Province in northern Argentina.

References

triplinervia
Flora of North America
Flora of South America
Plants described in 1818